Sagara is a city located in the Indian state of Karnataka. It is also a sub divisional and a taluk headquarters. Located in the Sahyadri Mountain range on the banks of river Varada, it is known for its proximity to Jog Falls and to the historical places of Ikkeri, Keladi and Varadamoola. The river Varada originates near Varada-moola. Sagara subdivision consists of Sagara, Soraba, Hosanagara and Shikaripur taluks.

City Municipal Council
Sagara city is one of the 74 Karnataka Municipal Reforms Project (KMRP) City in Karnataka. Sagara ULB was started in 1931 and became a City Municipal Council (CMC) grade two in the year 2007. The ULB consist of 31 wards with the respective number of councillors. The population of the city was 64,550 at the 2011 census and total area is 19.71 sq. km.

Etymology
Sagara derives its name from Sadashiva Sagara. Sadashiva Nayaka, ruler of Keladi dynasty built a lake in between Keladi and Ikkeri. Sadashiva Sagara is now called Ganapathi Kere (Ganapathi Lake). It is a subdivisional headquarters headed by a subdivisional magistrate and Fifth additional District Magistrate.

Economy 
The economy of Sagara is mainly driven by areca nut (betel nut), paddy, spice and forest products trade. Betel nut is the major cash crop grown in the area. Along with areca nut, spices like pepper, clove, cinnamon, nutmeg, and cocoa are grown. The economy of the city is highly volatile and is dependent on the variation in the pricing of these agriculture products. Sagara APMC is one of the main market for areca nut in Karnataka.

Sagara has a relatively high number of Gudigars – families that for generations have been engaged in sandalwood and ivory carving. The Gudigar men make idols, figurines and knickknacks like penholders, agarbathi stands, cuff links, photo frames and paper clips; the women are adept at making garlands and wreaths out of thin layers of scraped sandalwood.

Demographics 
At the 2001 census, Sagara had a population of 50,115. Males constituted 50% of the population and females 50%. Sagara had an average literacy rate of 79%, higher than the national average of 59.5%: male literacy was 82%, and female literacy was 75%. In Sagar, 11% of the population was under 6 years of age. At the 2011 census its population exceeded 54,550.

Transport

By road 
From the state capital Bangalore, Sagara can be reached by road through NH-69. (via Tumkur, Tiptur, Arsikere, Kadur, Tarikere, Bhadravathi and Shivamogga) KSRTC, the state government transport, runs several buses from Bangalore, including Hitech volvo and night services. From the coastal side, Sagara is accessible by road through Agumbe Ghat or Hulikal Ghat roads. Bus service is provided by KSRTC and several private bus operators. Sagara is well connected by road with major cities and towns of Coastal Karnataka, and most parts of interior Karnataka, except for the Northeast. It is an important bus junction. From November 2013, KSRTC introduced city buses in Sagara city.

By railway
Sagara has its own railway station, known as Sagara Jambagaru (station code: SRF). There are trains that connect Sagara with Bangalore and Mysore and a passenger train between Shimoga to talguppa passes through sagara.

By air
The nearest airport is Shivamogga Airport, which is about 78 km from Sagara and the nearest international airport is Mangalore Airport.

Education 
Sagara has a number of government and private institutions which offer many courses in post metric, bachelor's degree and post graduation.

TV and radio 
Sagara has an LPT-49 TV relay station airing Doordarshan national channel. Cable TV and direct to home services are widely used and these have replaced the conventional VHF/UHF TV antennas and satellite dish antennas.
Digital  cable is also available with Shikhara TV, which provides essential day to day information to the people of Sagara.
Sagara has an FM radio station airing FM Rainbow (100.1 MHz)

Tourism 
Tourist sites are indicated by milestones and hoardings which are usually in Kannada and English.

Nature tourism

Jog Falls 
Jog Falls is in Sagar taluk and is created by the Sharavathi River. It is approximately 30 km by National Highway 69 (NH-206 as per old NH numbering system). Jog falls is located 30 km from Sagara and 100 km from Shivamogga. It is also known as Gerusoppa Falls or Jogada Gundi in Kannada. It is the second-highest plunge waterfall in India. The drive from Shimoga to Jog falls is scenic and lush with greenery all around, clouds and mist floating among the green hills is a typical sight. July–August is the best time to visit Jog falls.

Honnemaradu 
Honnemaradu is situated on the banks of the backwaters of the Sharavati river. A big water mass extends up to the Chakra dam. It is about 35 km from Sagara city towards Jog and 10 km from Talaguppa. Indian Institute For Adventure Applications is a training school situated here which uses adventure as a platform for learning.

Holebaagilu 
Holebaagilu is situated on the banks of the Sharavati River about 30 km from Sagar. One has to take a diversion from B. H. Road towards Ikkeri Road to get there. The Sharavati backwaters of Linganamakki dam has submerged acres of land. It is in Kolur Grama Panchayat limits. One has to take a flatboat to get across the backwaters to reach the other side where Sigandooru is.

Sharavati Wildlife Sanctuary 
Sharavati Wildlife Sanctuary is in Sagar Taluk, Karnataka. It is 350 km from Bangalore. Located near Jog Falls, the sanctuary covers the Sharavati Valley Region, near the western border of Karnataka. It is spread over an area of 431 km.
The sanctuary is nourished by the Sharavati River. Linganamakki reservoir spread over an area of 128.7 km is a part of this sanctuary.

Linganamakki dam 
Linganamakki dam is built across the Sharavathi river and is 6 km from Jog Falls in Sagara taluk. It is the main feeder reservoir for the Mahatma Gandhi hydro-electric project. It has two power generating units of 27.5 MW

Dabbe Falls 
Dabbe Falls is located near Hosagadde in Sagar taluk. On the road from Sagara to Bhatkal, Hosagadde lies about 20 km from the town of Kargal. From Hosagadde a walk of 6–8 km into the forest leads to Dabbe Falls.

Places of worship 
Marikamba Temple, Sagara
The Marikamba Temple is located in Sagara City, in the Indian state of Karnataka. It features the image of the goddess Marikamba, a form of Durga or Parvati. The temple was built in the center of the city during the reign of Venkatappa Nayak who ruled over Keladi and Ikkeri kingdom during the 16th century. Marikamba was the family deity of the Nayaka dynasty.

 Keladi
Keladi has a Shiva temple of historical importance is located 6 km from the city. One has to take a diversion at Sorab Road. There is a museum containing old manuscripts written during the Keladi dynasty.

 Sigandooru
Sigandooru is a holy place of Goddess Chaudeshwari. A large temple of Goddess Chaudeshwari is here. This Goddess is a highly believed deity in Sagar and the surrounding taluks as a protector against theft and robbery. Coupons for entry will be distributed on first-come, first-served basis.

 Varadapura
Varadahalli, also known as Vaddalli is place is 6 km from the city where one has to take a diversion from Jog Road soon after the end of the city limits. It is known for the samadhi of Sri Sridhara Swami, who is one of the prominent 20th century saints of the region.

 Ikkeri
Ikkeri is a place is of historic importance due to the presence of a temple dedicated to Lord Shiva. One has to take a diversion at B. H. Road and travel 6 km.

 Kalasi
Kalase or Nadakalasi or Nadakalase is a small village about 8 kilometers away from Sagara in Shivamogga district of Karnataka. One has to travel along Sorab Road for 6 km and take a diversion. Hidden in its densely populated flora and fauna is a temple complex from the Hoysala times. Baleyanna Vergade (Heggade), a local ruler who had accepted the mighty Hoysalas as the overseeing authority of his regions during that time, has constructed two temples next to each other in 1218 AD, during the rule of Veera Ballala II. The temples are a mix of Hoysala and Dravidian temple architectures, but the Hoysala influences are there to be seen in abundance.

The larger of the two temples is the Mallikarjuna Temple dedicated to the Mallikarjuna Shiva Linga in its only sanctum sanctorum. A highlight of this temple are the smooth looking lathe turned pillars inside. They seem to have such a fine finish despite the fact that the stones used don't appear to be the best quality soap stones that we witness at Belur or Belavadi. The main shikhara is of Kadamba Nagara style.

The Rameshwara Temple at Nadakalasi is less extravagant, but equally well decorated, and has, to its credit, a Sala slaying the lion statue next to its Shikhara. The main deity is the Rameshwara Linga, but it has been referred to as Sadashiva in the past.

Nadakalasi's closeness to Sagara hasn't still ensured its visibility on the tourist map, although, equally closer towns of Keladi and Ikkeri enjoy better recall among visitors.

 Varadamoola
Varadamoola is 6 km from Sagara City. River Varada originates at this place. Varada flows through the town of Banavasi before joining Tungabhadra.

 Shettisara
This place has a Shani temple and Laxminarayana Temple.

 Ganapathi temple
This temple is a unique feature of the scenic beauty of Sagara. It is situated beside the Ganapathi lake, where temple and  mosque are together side by side. This symbolises social harmony among people of sagara.

St Joseph's Church

Major roads passing through Sagara taluk

 National Highways:
NH-69 (NH-206 as per old national highway numbering system)
 State Highways:
SH-50 passes through Jog, Mavinagundi, Siddapur, Chandragutti, Sorab.
SH-62 passes through Siralakoppa and Sagar.
SH-77 passes through Sorab, Masur, Sagar, Hosanagar.

Rare disorders

Handigodu syndrome 
Handigodu joint disease (HJD) is a familial skeletal disorder. Handigodu, near Sagara is one of only two places in the world where this disorder is to be found – the other being northern Zululand, South Africa. Severe precocious, progressive degenerative osteoarthropathy causes marked physical handicap by adulthood. The clinical and radiological manifestations are very similar to MJD (Mseleni joint disease) and they are sometimes believed to be the same entity.

Kyasanur Forest disease 
Kyasanur Forest disease, also known as Monkey Disease is a rare endemic tick-borne viral haemorrhagic fever which was first noticed in the Kattinakere village, near Sorab which is in the Kyasanur forest range.

Notable people from Sagara
Raghaveshwara Bharathi- Ramachandrapura Mutt Pontiff and Guru of Havyakas.
 Diganth, Kannada film actor
 Bharat Chipli, former cricketer who played for Karnataka and Deccan Chargers
 Archana Udupa, singer
 K. V. Subbanna, Magsaysay award winner
 Shantaveri Gopala Gowda, leader of socialist movement
 Na D'Souza, novel writer
 Arun Sagar, theatre artist and Big Boss Kannada, season 1 runner up
 Kagodu Thimmappa- He was a part of Kagodu Chaluvali and ex Revenue Minister of Karnataka Legislative Assembly

References 

 
Taluks in Shimoga District
Cities and towns in Shimoga district